Charles Milton Bell (April 3, 1848 – May 12, 1893) was an American photographer who was noted for his portraits of Native Americans and other figures of the United States in the late 1800s. He was called "one of Washington's leading portrait photographers during the last quarter of the nineteenth century" by the Library of Congress.

Bell was the youngest member of a photographer family who had a studio in Washington, DC in the 1860s and 1870s. He took over the family studio Bell & Brothers and started his own studio, C. M. Bell, in 1873. Bell worked with Ferdinand Vandeveer Hayden, who sent visiting Native Americans to Bell's studio to have their portraits made. Bell also made photographs  of Native Americans for the Department of the Interior and the Bureau of American Ethnology where he assisted in-house photographers.

Personal life
Bell was married to Annie Colley and they had two children, Charles Milton Bell and Colley Wood Bell. He was buried at Oak Hill Cemetery in Washington, D.C.

Legacy

After Bell's death in 1893, his wife continued to operate the studio with her sons. It was sold in the early 1900s to Atha and Cunningham who retained the original name. The negatives were sold to  I. M. Boyce who sold the Native American images to the Bureau of American Ethnology and most of the remainder to Alexander Graham Bell. From there they would up owned by the American Genetic Association who donated them to the Library of Congress. The C. M. Bell Studio Collection held at the Library of Congress 30,000 glass negatives from 1873 to 1916 created by the studio and its successors.

Example works

References

External links

 The Bell Family Repository at C.W. Bell's Lombardy Group
 C. M. Bell Studio Collection at the Library of Congress
 Charles Milton Bell photographs of American Indians, circa 1874-1890 at Smithsonian Institution

1848 births
1893 deaths
American portrait photographers
People from Fredericksburg, Virginia
Photographers from Virginia
19th-century American photographers
Photographers from Washington, D.C.
Burials at Oak Hill Cemetery (Washington, D.C.)